Zambezi East is a constituency of the National Assembly of Zambia. It covers the eastern part of Zambezi and the towns of Chikomo, Chitongo, Kakeki, Muzaza, Nyakawanda and Samahamba in Zambezi District of North-Western Province.

List of MPs

References

Constituencies of the National Assembly of Zambia
Constituencies established in 1968
1968 establishments in Zambia